The Brown School at Washington University in St. Louis is a school for the training of social science researchers. 

The Brown School offers a Master of Social Work (MSW), a Master of Public Health (MPH), a Master of Social Policy, a PhD in Social Work, and a PhD in Public Health Sciences. As one of the academic units of Washington University in St. Louis, the Brown School was founded in 1925 as the department of social work. The school was endowed in 1945 by Bettie Bofinger Brown and named for her husband, George Warren Brown, a St. Louis philanthropist and co-founder of the Brown Shoe Company. The school was the first in the country to have a building for the purpose of social work education, and it is also a founding member of the Association of Schools and Programs of Public Health. The school is housed within Brown, Goldfarb, and Hillman Halls.

History 

1925

Washington University introduces a social work program under the leadership of Professor Frank Bruno. This program was initially named the Washington University Training Course for Social Workers and was part of the Department of Sociology in the College of Liberal Arts.

1926

The social work training program transferred to the School of Commerce and Finance, which was then renamed the School of Business and Public Administration.

1928

The George Warren Brown Department of Social Work is established with monies from the estate of George Warren Brown, a prominent shoe manufacturer.

1937

The Washington University community and alumni of the George Warren Brown Department of Social Work dedicate Brown Hall.  Brown Hall is the first building in the nation constructed to house a program of social work education.  George C. Throop, then chancellor, opened the first evening’s dedication ceremonies with a tribute to George Warren Brown and his wife, Betty Bofinger Brown, whose bequest in memory of her husband had made the building possible.

1937-1945

Brown Hall is home to the Department of Social Work as well as the departments of history, political science, anthropology and sociology.  As the program, grew the school expanded to occupy the entire building.

1945

The University establishes the George Warren Brown School of Social Work as a separate school with Benjamin E. Youngdahl as its dean. Years later, the estate of George Warren Brown donated $1 million to the University to create a permanent endowment for the school.

1998

The Brown School and Washington University celebrate the dedication of Alvin Goldfarb Hall, a four-story building that doubled the capacity of the school.

2009

The Master of Public Health program enrolls its first class, and collaborates with the new Institute for Public Health. Students are able to obtain a dual degree with the MSW. The Institute for Public Health is designed to be multi-disciplinary, and has collaboration from the School of Engineering's Technology for Environmental Public Health and International Development program, the Olin Business School's undergraduate major in healthcare management, and the College of Arts and Science's undergraduate minor in public health.

Research centers 
The Brown School is home to several research centers with distinct areas of emphasis, among them:
 Kathryn M. Buder Center for American Indian Studies – The Kathryn M. Buder Center for American Indian Studies is one of the most respected centers in the nation for academic advancement and the study of American Indian issues related to social work.
 Center for Public Health Systems Science was launched in 2001 and helps create an innovative understanding of how policies and organizational systems affect public health problems. The Center translates research results to inform chronic disease prevention policy and improve public health practices.
 Social System Design Laboratory advances the science and field of system dynamics for human services including social work, education, medicine, and public health. The Lab is a resource for students, researchers, and professionals to help build the capacity of those who want to learn and apply system dynamics in order to address specific problems in organizations and communities.
 Center for Diabetes Translation Research aims to eliminate disparities in Type 2 diabetes by translating evidence-based interventions to high-risk populations. The NIH-funded research center is a collaboration between the Brown School and the Medical School and was formed to address health literacy and health communication; dissemination and implementation; health economics and health policy; and community-based participatory research and cultural competency.
 Center for Mental Health Services Research – The Center for Mental Health Services Research, through its national network of collaborative research partners, works with public social service agencies to build a base of evidence designed to address the challenges of delivering mental health services to vulnerable populations. The center is one of only 11 centers of its kind in the country and the only one part of a social work school.
 Center for Obesity Prevention and Policy Research – The Center for Obesity Prevention and Policy Research develops and disseminates new knowledge to inform the creation and implementation of programs and policies designed to prevent obesity.
 Center for Social Development – The Center for Social Development's domestic and international research focuses on building assets of individuals and families so they can invest in life goals such as homes, education, and enterprise development. The Center's work also explores issues of civic engagement to ensure the people of all ages and economic levels actively participate in our society.
 Center for Tobacco Policy Research – The Center for Tobacco Policy Research focuses on the research and evaluation of tobacco control programs and policies in Missouri and across the country. The Center is also home to the Missouri Evaluation Connection which offers information-sharing and partnerships among public health professionals and program evaluators to promote evidence-based, sustainable public health programs and policies in Missouri.
 Center for Violence and Injury Prevention – The Center for Violence and Injury Prevention is a CDC-funded research center that pulls from multiple disciplines and partnerships to advance the prevention science and develop evidence-based, real-world strategies for preventing child maltreatment, intimate partner violence, sexual violence, and suicide attempts.
 Centene Center for Health Transformation – The Centene Center for Health Transformation is a unique academic-industry collaboration between the Brown School at Washington University in St. Louis, the Center for Advanced Hindsight at Duke University, and Centene Corporation. The center is a Community-Corporate-Academic Health Care Partnership that advances life-centric health research to improve lives so communities can thrive.
 Health Communication Research Laboratory – The Health Communication Research Laboratory is one of the leading centers in the U.S. dedicated to the research, development, and dissemination of health communication programs that enhance the health of individuals and populations. 
 Prevention Research Center in St. Louis – The Prevention Research Center in St. Louis is a joint effort between Washington University in St. Louis and Saint Louis University.  The Center explores the behaviors that place Americans at risk for chronic diseases such as obesity, cancer, and stroke.  Center researchers are particularly concerned with the improvement of the quality of life among special populations: the young, elderly, and the uninsured.

References

Washington University in St. Louis
Schools of social work in the United States
Educational institutions established in 1925
1925 establishments in Missouri